The S8G reactor is a naval reactor used by the United States Navy to provide electricity generation and propulsion on warships. The S8G designation stands for:

 S = Submarine platform
 8 = Eighth generation core designed by the contractor
 G = General Electric was the contracted designer

History 

The S8G reactor was designed by General Electric for use on the s.

Design 
This nuclear reactor utilizes natural circulation which is capable of operating at a significant fraction of full power without reactor coolant pumps.

A land-based prototype of the reactor plant was built at Knolls Atomic Power Laboratory's Kesselring Site in West Milton, New York.  The prototype was used for testing and crew training throughout the 1980s.  In 1994, the core was replaced with an S6W reactor, designed for the then-new Seawolf-class submarine.

The prototype is equipped with an automatic reactor fill system that can flood the reactor with borated water in the event of a loss-of-coolant accident.

References

 

United States naval reactors